"Straight-Out Democratic Party" (or "Straightout Democratic Party") is the name used by three minor American political parties between 1872 and 1890.

The first Straight-Out Democratic Party played a minor role in the U.S. presidential election of 1872. An unrelated Straightout Democrat (no hyphen) faction of the South Carolina Democratic Party triumphed in the 1876 South Carolina gubernatorial election, and a revival of the 1876 party played a minor role in the 1890 South Carolina gubernatorial election. The Straightout Democrat was also a newspaper in Columbia, South Carolina, active between 1878 and 1879.

1872 national party 
The Straight-Out Democratic Party was a Southern faction that broke with the Democratic Party in the 1872 presidential election. Dissatisfied with the Democratic nominee Horace Greeley, they held a convention on 16 August in Louisville, Kentucky; 604 delegates from all states attended. The delegates nominated for President Charles O'Conor (who informed them by telegram that he would not accept their nomination) and for Vice President John Quincy Adams II.

Philosophy 
In a letter accepting his nomination, Adams provided a lengthy description of the party's philosophy: 

Despite O'Conor's refusal and lacking time to find a new candidate, the party ran the ticket anyway. They received 23,054 votes (0.36%) and no Electoral College votes.

1876 South Carolina gubernatorial election 
In the 1876 gubernatorial election in South Carolina, the Straightout Democrats (no hyphen) were an activist faction that succeeded in taking control of the party. They sometimes wore red shirts to show their support for the paramilitary white supremacist groups known as Red Shirts, who used violence and the threat of violence to prevent blacks from voting. Their candidate, Wade Hampton III, became governor, although violence made it possible.

1890 South Carolina gubernatorial election 
An unsuccessful breakaway group of Democrats in the 1890 South Carolina gubernatorial election called themselves the Straightout Democrats. They wore red shirts in memory of the 1876 party.

Newspaper 
The Delaware Straight-Out Truth Teller was the name of a newspaper published in Wilmington, Delaware, in 1872.

The Straight-Out Democrat was the name of a newspaper published in Columbia, South Carolina, between 1878 and 1879.

References

External links 
 "The Democratic Wake". The New York Times. 9 July 1872.

Defunct political parties in the United States
Democratic Party (United States)
Factions in the Democratic Party (United States)
Florida Democratic Party
Political parties established in 1872
1872 United States presidential election
1876 South Carolina elections
1890 South Carolina elections